Asura unilinea is a moth of the family Erebidae. It is found in the Philippines (Luzon).

References

unilinea
Moths of Asia